Freya Constance Colbert (born 8 March 2004) is an English international swimmer. She has represented England at the Commonwealth Games and won a bronze medal.

Biography
Colbert was educated at Kesteven & Grantham Girls School and won three medals at the 2022 British Swimming Championships including a gold medal in the 400 metres individual medley. She consequently represented Great Britain at the 2022 World Aquatics Championships.

In 2022, she was selected for the 2022 Commonwealth Games in Birmingham, where she competed in three events; the women's 200 metres freestyle, finishing in 13th place, the women's 400 metres freestyle, the 400 metres individual medley where she just finished just outside of the medal places in 4th and the 4 x 200 metres freestyle relay, where she won a bronze medal.

References

External links
 
 
 
 

2004 births
Living people
English female swimmers
British female swimmers
Swimmers at the 2022 Commonwealth Games
Commonwealth Games competitors for England
Commonwealth Games bronze medallists for England
Commonwealth Games medallists in swimming
European Aquatics Championships medalists in swimming
Medallists at the 2022 Commonwealth Games